TSS Ramsey Town was a packet steamer which was initially ordered and operated by the Midland Railway Company under the name Antrim until it was acquired by the Isle of Man Steam Packet Company in 1928.

Construction & dimensions
Ramsey Town was built at the Clydeside yards of John Brown & Co. in 1904, registered at Belfast and named Antrim. Ramsey Town had an operating speed of 21 knots.

The launch of the vessel on 22 March 1904 was a near disaster. On reaching the fairway, the steamer was swept aside by the combined force of wind and tide towards a Cunarder on the adjoining stocks. Several of the uprights at the stern of the Cunarder were knocked down by the Antrim, and disaster was narrowly averted by the assistance of the tugs in attendance. The Antrim sustained no damage beyond having her paint badly scratched

Service life
On entering service with the Midland Railway Company she operated on the Belfast-Heysham service, and was purchased by the Steam Packet from the London Midland and Scottish Railway group of which the Midland Railway had become part, in 1928. The cost of the purchase, including alterations to the vessel, was £14,612.

On 6 September 1935 she rescued the flier Alex Henshaw when his aircraft came down in the Irish Sea while competing in the King's Cup air race. Henshaw presented her commanding officer, Captain Archibald Holkham, with a barometer bearing an inscription which acknowledged that his skill and seamanship had probably saved the airman's life.

Disposal
Ramsey Town had one of the shortest records of service in the Steam Packet Fleet. She was withdrawn from service in 1936, and eventually scrapped at Preston in 1937.

References

Bibliography
 Chappell, Connery (1980). Island Lifeline T.Stephenson & Sons Ltd 

Ships of the Isle of Man Steam Packet Company
1904 ships
Steamships of the United Kingdom